Red algae, or Rhodophyta, are one of the oldest groups of eukaryotic algae. The Rhodophyta also comprises one of the largest phyla of algae, containing over 7,000 currently recognized species with taxonomic revisions ongoing. The majority of species (6,793) are found in the Florideophyceae (class), and mostly consist of multicellular, marine algae, including many notable seaweeds. Red algae are abundant in marine habitats but relatively rare in freshwaters. Approximately 5% of red algae species occur in freshwater environments, with greater concentrations found in warmer areas. Except for two coastal cave dwelling species in the asexual class Cyanidiophyceae, there are no terrestrial species, which may be due to an evolutionary bottleneck in which the last common ancestor lost about 25% of its core genes and much of its evolutionary plasticity.

The red algae form a distinct group characterized by having eukaryotic cells without flagella and centrioles, chloroplasts that lack external endoplasmic reticulum and contain unstacked (stroma) thylakoids, and use phycobiliproteins as accessory pigments, which give them their red color. But despite their name they can vary greatly in color from bright green, soft pink, resembling brown algae, shades or red and purple, and be almost black at greater depths. Red algae store sugars as floridean starch, which is a type of starch that consists of highly branched amylopectin without amylose, as food reserves outside their plastids. Most red algae are also multicellular, macroscopic, marine, and reproduce sexually. The red algal life history is typically an alternation of generations that may have three generations rather than two.
The coralline algae, which secrete calcium carbonate and play a major role in building coral reefs, belong here. Red algae such as dulse (Palmaria palmata) and laver (nori/gim) are a traditional part of European and Asian cuisines and are used to make other products such as agar, carrageenans and other food additives.

Evolution

Chloroplasts evolved following an endosymbiotic event between an ancestral, photosynthetic cyanobacterium and an early eukaryotic phagotroph. This event (termed primary endosymbiosis) resulted in the origin of the red and green algae, and the glaucophytes, which make up the oldest evolutionary lineages of photosynthetic eukaryotes. A secondary endosymbiosis event involving an ancestral red alga and a heterotrophic eukaryote resulted in the evolution and diversification of several other photosynthetic lineages such as Cryptophyta, Haptophyta, Stramenopiles (or Heterokontophyta), and Alveolata. In addition to multicellular brown algae, it is estimated that more than half of all known species of microbial eukaryotes harbor red-alga-derived plastids.

Red algae are divided into the Cyanidiophyceae, a class of unicellular and thermoacidophilic extremophiles found in sulphuric hot springs and other acidic environments, an adaptation partly made possible by horizontal gene transfers from prokaryotes, with about 1% of their genome having this origin, and two sister clades called SCRP (Stylonematophyceae, Compsopogonophyceae, Rhodellophyceae and Porphyridiophyceae) and BF (Bangiophyceae and Florideophyceae), which are found in both marine and freshwater environments. The SCRP clade are microalgae, consisting of both unicellular forms and multicellular microscopic filaments and blades. The BF are macroalgae, seaweed that usually do not grow to more than about 50 cm in length, but a few species can reach lengths of 2 m. Most rhodophytes are marine with a worldwide distribution, and are often found at greater depths compared to other seaweeds. While this was formerly attributed to the presence of pigments (such as phycoerythrin) that would permit red algae to inhabit greater depths than other macroalgae by chromatic adaption, recent evidence calls this into question (e.g. the discovery of green algae at great depth in the Bahamas).  Some marine species are found on sandy shores, while most others can be found attached to rocky substrata. Freshwater species account for 5% of red algal diversity, but they also have a worldwide distribution in various habitats; they generally prefer clean, high-flow streams with clear waters and rocky bottoms, but with some exceptions. A few freshwater species are found in black waters with sandy bottoms  and even fewer are found in more lentic waters. Both marine and freshwater taxa are represented by free-living macroalgal forms and smaller endo/epiphytic/zoic forms, meaning they live in or on other algae, plants, and animals. In addition, some marine species have adopted a parasitic lifestyle and may be found on closely or more distantly related red algal hosts.

Taxonomy

In the system of Adl et al. 2005, the red algae are classified in the Archaeplastida, along with the glaucophytes and green algae plus land plants (Viridiplantae or Chloroplastida). The authors use a hierarchical arrangement where the clade names do not signify rank; the class name Rhodophyceae is used for the red algae. No subdivisions are given; the authors say, "Traditional subgroups are artificial constructs, and no longer valid."

Many studies published since Adl et al. 2005 have provided evidence that is in agreement for monophyly in the Archaeplastida (including red algae). However, other studies have suggested Archaeplastida is paraphyletic. , the situation appears unresolved.

Below are other published taxonomies of the red algae using molecular and traditional alpha taxonomic data; however, the taxonomy of the red algae is still in a state of flux (with classification above the level of order having received little scientific attention for most of the 20th century).

 If one defines the kingdom Plantae to mean the Archaeplastida, the red algae will be part of that kingdom.
 If Plantae are defined more narrowly, to be the Viridiplantae, then the red algae might be considered their own kingdom,  or part of the kingdom Protista.

A major research initiative to reconstruct the Red Algal Tree of Life (RedToL) using phylogenetic and genomic approach is funded by the National Science Foundation as part of the Assembling the Tree of Life Program.

Classification comparison

Some sources (such as Lee) place all red algae into the class "Rhodophyceae". (Lee's organization is not a comprehensive classification, but a selection of orders considered common or important.)

A subphylum - Proteorhodophytina - has been proposed to encompass the existing classes Compsopogonophyceae, Porphyridiophyceae, Rhodellophyceae and Stylonematophyceae. This proposal was made on the basis of the analysis of the plastid genomes.

Species of red algae
Over 7,000 species are currently described for the red algae, but the taxonomy is in constant flux with new species described each year. The vast majority of these are marine with about 200 that live only in fresh water.

Some examples of species and genera of red algae are:
Cyanidioschyzon merolae, a primitive red alga
Atractophora hypnoides
Gelidiella calcicola
Lemanea, a freshwater genus
Palmaria palmata, dulse
Schmitzia hiscockiana
Chondrus crispus, Irish moss
Mastocarpus stellatus
Vanvoorstia bennettiana, became extinct in the early 20th century
Acrochaetium efflorescens
Audouinella, with freshwater as well as marine species
Polysiphonia ceramiaeformis, banded siphon weed
Vertebrata simulans

Morphology
Red algal morphology is diverse ranging from unicellular forms to complex parenchymatous and non- parenchymatous thallus. Red algae have double cell walls. The outer layers contain the polysaccharides agarose and agaropectin that can be extracted from the cell walls by boiling as agar. The internal walls are mostly cellulose. They also have the most gene-rich plastid genomes known.

Cell structure
Red algae do not have flagella and centrioles during their entire life cycle. Presence of normal spindle fibres, microtubules, un-stacked photosynthetic membranes, presence of phycobilin pigment granules, presence of pit connection between cells filamentous genera, absence of chloroplast endoplasmic reticulum are the distinguishing characters of red algal cell structure.

Chloroplasts
Presence of the water-soluble pigments called phycobilins (phycocyanobilin, phycoerythrobilin, phycourobilin and phycobiliviolin), which are localized into phycobilisomes, gives red algae their distinctive color. Chloroplast contains evenly spaced and ungrouped thylakoids. Other pigments include chlorophyll a, α- and β-carotene, lutein and zeaxanthin. Double membrane of chloroplast envelope surrounds the chloroplast. Absence of grana and attachment of phycobilisomes on the stromal surface of the thylakoid membrane are other distinguishing characters of red algal chloroplast.

Storage products
The major photosynthetic products include floridoside (major product), D‐isofloridoside, digeneaside, mannitol, sorbitol, dulcitol etc. Floridean starch (similar to amylopectin in land plants), a long term storage product, is deposited freely (scattered) in the cytoplasm. The concentration of photosynthetic products are altered by the environmental conditions like change in pH, the salinity of medium, change in light intensity, nutrient limitation etc. When the salinity of the medium increases the production of floridoside is increased in order to prevent water from leaving the algal cells.

Pit connections and pit plugs

Pit connections
Pit connections and pit plugs are unique and distinctive features of red algae that form during the process of cytokinesis following mitosis. In red algae, cytokinesis is incomplete. Typically, a small pore is left in the middle of the newly formed partition. The pit connection is formed where the daughter cells remain in contact.

Shortly after the pit connection is formed, cytoplasmic continuity is blocked by the generation of a pit plug, which is deposited in the wall gap that connects the cells.

Connections between cells having a common parent cell are called primary pit connections. Because apical growth is the norm in red algae, most cells have two primary pit connections, one to each adjacent cell.

Connections that exist between cells not sharing a common parent cell are labelled secondary pit connections. These connections are formed when an unequal cell division produced a nucleated daughter cell that then fuses to an adjacent cell. Patterns of secondary pit connections can be seen in the order Ceramiales.

Pit plugs
After a pit connection is formed, tubular membranes appear. A granular protein called the plug core then forms around the membranes. The tubular membranes eventually disappear. While some orders of red algae simply have a plug core, others have an associated membrane at each side of the protein mass, called cap membranes. The pit plug continues to exist between the cells until one of the cells dies. When this happens, the living cell produces a layer of wall material that seals off the plug.

Function
The pit connections have been suggested to function as structural reinforcement, or as avenues for cell-to-cell communication and transport in red algae, however little data supports this hypothesis.

Reproduction
The reproductive cycle of red algae may be triggered by factors such as day length. Red algae reproduce sexually as well as asexually. Asexual reproduction can occur through the production of spores and by vegetative means (fragmentation, cell division or propagules production).

Fertilization
Red algae lack motile sperm. Hence, they rely on water currents to transport their gametes to the female organs – although their sperm are capable of "gliding" to a carpogonium's trichogyne. Also animals help with the dispersal and fertilization of the gametes. The first species discovered to do so is the isopod Idotea balthica.

The trichogyne will continue to grow until it encounters a spermatium; once it has been fertilized, the cell wall at its base progressively thickens, separating it from the rest of the carpogonium at its base.

Upon their collision, the walls of the spermatium and carpogonium dissolve. The male nucleus divides and moves into the carpogonium; one half of the nucleus merges with the carpogonium's nucleus.

The polyamine spermine is produced, which triggers carpospore production.

Spermatangia may have long, delicate appendages, which increase their chances of "hooking up".

Life cycle
They display alternation of generations. In addition to a gametophyte generation, many have two sporophyte generations, the carposporophyte-producing carpospores, which germinate into a tetrasporophyte – this produces spore tetrads, which dissociate and germinate into gametophytes. The gametophyte is typically (but not always) identical to the tetrasporophyte.

Carpospores may also germinate directly into thalloid gametophytes, or the carposporophytes may produce a tetraspore without going through a (free-living) tetrasporophyte phase.
Tetrasporangia may be arranged in a row (zonate), in a cross (cruciate), or in a tetrad.

The carposporophyte may be enclosed within the gametophyte, which may cover it with branches to form a cystocarp.

The two following case studies may be helpful to understand some of the life histories algae may display:

In a simple case, such as Rhodochorton investiens:

In the carposporophyte: a spermatium merges with a trichogyne (a long hair on the female sexual organ), which then divides to form carposporangia – which produce carpospores.

Carpospores germinate into gametophytes, which produce sporophytes. Both of these are very similar; they produce monospores from monosporangia "just below a cross-wall in a filament" and their spores are "liberated through the apex of sporangial cell."

The spores of a sporophyte produce either tetrasporophytes. Monospores produced by this phase germinates immediately, with no resting phase, to form an identical copy of the parent. Tetrasporophytes may also produce a carpospore, which germinates to form another tetrasporophyte.

The gametophyte may replicate using monospores, but produces sperm in spermatangia, and "eggs"(?) in carpogonium.

A rather different example is Porphyra gardneri:

In its diploid phase, a carpospore can germinate to form a filamentous "conchocelis stage", which can also self-replicate using monospores. The conchocelis stage eventually produces conchosporangia. The resulting conchospore germinates to form a tiny prothallus with rhizoids, which develops to a cm-scale leafy thallus. This too can reproduce via monospores, which are produced inside the thallus itself. They can also reproduce via spermatia, produced internally, which are released to meet a prospective carpogonium in its conceptacle.

Chemistry

The  values of red algae reflect their lifestyles. The largest difference results from their photosynthetic metabolic pathway: algae that use HCO3 as a carbon source have less negative  values than those that only use .  An additional difference of about 1.71‰ separates groups intertidal from those below the lowest tide line, which are never exposed to atmospheric carbon. The latter group uses the more 13C-negative  dissolved in sea water, whereas those with access to atmospheric carbon reflect the more positive signature of this reserve.

Photosynthetic pigments of Rhodophyta are chlorophylls a and d. Red algae are red due to phycoerythrin. They contain the sulfated polysaccharide carrageenan in the amorphous sections of their cell walls, although red algae from the genus Porphyra contain porphyran. They also produce a specific type of tannin called phlorotannins, but in a lower amount than brown algae do.

Genomes and transcriptomes of red algae 

As enlisted in realDB, 27 complete transcriptomes and 10 complete genomes sequences of red algae are available. Listed below are the 10 complete genomes of red algae.

Cyanidioschyzon merolae, Cyanidiophyceae
Galdieria sulphuraria, Cyanidiophyceae
Pyropia yezoensis, Bangiophyceae
Chondrus crispus, Florideophyceae
Porphyridium purpureum, Porphyridiophyceae
Porphyra umbilicalis, Bangiophyceae
 Gracilaria changii, Gracilariales
 Galdieria phlegrea, Cyanidiophytina
 Gracilariopsis lemaneiformis, Gracilariales
 Gracilariopsis chorda, Gracilariales

Fossil record
One of the oldest fossils identified as a red alga is also the oldest fossil eukaryote that belongs to a specific modern taxon. Bangiomorpha pubescens, a multicellular fossil from arctic Canada, strongly resembles the modern red alga Bangia and occurs in rocks dating to 1.05 billion years ago.

Two kinds of fossils resembling red algae were found sometime between 2006 and 2011 in well-preserved sedimentary rocks in Chitrakoot, central India. The presumed red algae lie embedded in fossil mats of cyanobacteria, called stromatolites, in 1.6 billion-year-old Indian phosphorite – making them the oldest plant-like fossils ever found by about 400 million years.

Red algae are important builders of limestone reefs. The earliest such coralline algae, the solenopores, are known from the Cambrian period. Other algae of different origins filled a similar role in the late Paleozoic, and in more recent reefs.

Calcite crusts that have been interpreted as the remains of coralline red algae, date to the Ediacaran Period. Thallophytes resembling coralline red algae are known from the late Proterozoic Doushantuo formation.

Relationship to other algae
Chromista and Alveolata algae (e.g., chrysophytes, diatoms, phaeophytes, dinophytes) seem to have evolved from bikonts that have acquired red algae as endosymbionts. According to this theory, over time these endosymbiont red algae have evolved to become chloroplasts. This part of endosymbiotic theory is supported by various structural and genetic similarities.

Human consumption
Red algae have a long history of use as a source of nutritional, functional food ingredients and pharmaceutical substances. They are a source of antioxidants including polyphenols, and phycobiliproteins and contain proteins, minerals, trace elements, vitamins and essential fatty acids. Traditionally red algae are eaten raw, in salads, soups, meal and condiments. Several species are food crops, in particular members of the genus Porphyra, variously known as nori (Japan), gim (Korea), 紫菜 (China). Laver and dulse (Palmaria palmata) are consumed in Britain. Some of the red algal species like Gracilaria and Laurencia are rich in polyunsaturated fatty acids (eicopentaenoic acid, docohexaenoic acid, arachidonic acid) and have protein content up to 47% of total biomass. Where a big portion of world population is getting insufficient daily iodine intake, a 150 ug/day requirement of iodine is obtained from a single gram of red algae. Red algae, like Gracilaria, Gelidium, Euchema, Porphyra, Acanthophora, and Palmaria
are primarily known for their industrial use for phycocolloids (agar, algin, furcellaran and carrageenan) as thickening agent, textiles, food, anticoagulants, water-binding agents etc. Dulse (Palmaria palmata) is one of the most consumed red algae and is a source of iodine, protein, magnesium and calcium. China, Japan, Republic of Korea are the top producers of seaweeds. In East and Southeast Asia, agar is most commonly produced from Gelidium amansii. These rhodophytes are easily grown and, for example, nori cultivation in Japan goes back more than three centuries.

Gallery

See also
Brown algae
Green algae
History of phycology

References

External links
AlgaeBase: Rhodophyta
Seaweed Site: Rhodophyta
Tree of Life: Rhodophyta
Monterey Bay Flora

 
Proterozoic first appearances